The 1999 IFAF World Championship was the inaugural IFAF World Championship, an international American football championship run by the International Federation of American Football (IFAF). It was played in Palermo, Italy from 24 June to 4 July 1999. The tournament was contested by six nations and was won by Japan.

Participants

Rosters

Group stage

Group A

Group B

Fifth place match

Third place match

Final

Both teams entered the gold medal game undefeated in group play. The Mexico defense had not allowed any points, shutting out their two previous opponents, and the Mexican offense was impressive in beating Finland 89-0 (the most points ever in an IFAF Tournament game) and Italy 54-0. The Championship Game was a defensive struggle, with both teams committing turnovers (5 by Mexico, 2 by Japan), and for the first time in the tournament, Mexico did not score a point in any quarter. Japan held a slight advantage in total yards gained (233 to Mexico's 198). In overtime, Japan scored first on 5 yard pass from Sunaga to Abe. The extra point kick was wide, and Japan led 6-0. As they had all game, the Japanese defense kept Mexico out of the endzone, sealing the victory for Japan.

Winner

Statistics

References

1999 in American football
1999 in Italian sport
1999
American football in Italy
International sports competitions hosted by Italy
June 1999 sports events in Europe
July 1999 sports events in Europe